A Flor De Piel (English Title: To Flower of Skin) was a short-lived Spanish-language telenovela (daily hour-long dramatic show) first broadcast in 1996 in many Spanish-speaking countries and in the US.   It starred Mariana Garza as Mariana, a student struggling to deal with a difficult life.   

The series was produced by Television Azteca (TV Azteca), a Mexican company.   

The show's theme-song was also titled "A Flor De Piel", and was sung by Mariana Garza.

References

1994 telenovelas
Mexican telenovelas
TV Azteca telenovelas
1994 Mexican television series debuts
1994 Mexican television series endings
Spanish-language telenovelas